Steve Ngoura (born 22 February 2005) is a French professional footballer who plays for Le Havre AC.

Early life 
Born in Ivry-sur-Seine, Val-de-Marne, Steve Ngoura grew up in Vitry, where he first played football, before joining the HAC , after a two years spell at Choisy-le-Roi.

Club career 
Steve Ngoura quickly rose as a great prospect of the Normand academy, starting to play with the National 3 reserve during the 2021–22 season, after being a standout player in the Coupe Gambardella. His team reached the round of 16 in the youth competition, as Ngoura scored the only goal of the game against PSG, that knocked out a team including the likes of Warren Zaïre-Emery and Ismaël Gharbi.

He made his professional debut for Le Havre AC on the 6 August 2022, replacing Nabil Alioui during a 1–0 away Ligue 2 loss to Valenciennes.

References

External links

2005 births
Living people
French footballers
France youth international footballers
Association football forwards
People from Ivry-sur-Seine
Le Havre AC players
Ligue 2 players